Hugh Patrick Mullin (March 20, 1878 – June 9, 1948) was a Seaman in the United States Navy and a Medal of Honor recipient.

Medal of Honor citation
Rank and organization: Seaman, U.S. Navy. Born: March 20, 1878, Richmond, Ill. Accredited to: Illinois. G.O. No.: 537, January 8, 1900.

Citation:

On board the U.S.S. Texas during the coaling of that vessel at Hampton Roads, Va., 11 November 1899. Jumping overboard while wearing a pair of heavy rubber boots and at great risk to himself, Mullin rescued Alfred Kosminski, apprentice, second class, who fell overboard, by supporting him until he was safely hauled from the water.

Career
Mullin served in the Philippines and rose to the rank of Chief Master at Arms.

He died in Fresno, California.

See also
 List of Medal of Honor recipients during peacetime

References
 

1878 births
1948 deaths
United States Navy Medal of Honor recipients
United States Navy sailors
People from Richmond, Illinois
American military personnel of the Philippine–American War
Non-combat recipients of the Medal of Honor
Burials at Golden Gate National Cemetery